Usun Yoon (born 27 May 1977) is a South Korean actress and reporter who lives in Spain.

Early life
Yoon was born in 1977 in Busan, South Korea. She studied Political Science, International relations and Linguistics in Busan University of Foreign Studies (1994–1996). She went later to Toronto to follow her studies (1996–1998). She later studied drama in the Spanish company theatre "La Barraca" in Madrid (2002–2004).

Career

She worked later as a publicity model and took part in several videoclips (Alejandro Sanz, The Corrs or Carlos Jean)

She is well known in Spain for work on TV satirical news show El intermedio, on Spanish network La Sexta from 2007 to 2013.

Films 
 2003: Mala uva, Javier Domingo.
 2003: Inconscientes, Joaquín Oristell
 2003: La luna en botella
 2003: Cosas que hacen que la vida valga la pena, Manuel Gómez Pereira
 2005: Hotel Tívoli, Antón Reixa
 2005: Torrente 3, Santiago Segura
 2005: Un corte a su medida (short film), Aric Chetrit
 2009: Mediterranean Food, Hoshi

TV 
Odiosas
 Motivos personales Tele 5
Lobos Antena 3
Manolito Gafotas Antena 3
Las estupendas
La sopa boba Antena 3
Escenario Madrid
Celebrity MasterChef España Season 2

As a reporter 
Punto y medio - 2003 / 2004 (Canal Sur)
Ratones coloraos - 2004 / 2006 (Canal Sur)
Campanadas de fin de año - 2011 / 2012 (La Sexta)
El intermedio – 2007/2013 (La Sexta)
Hable con ellas - 2014 (Telecinco)

References

External links 

 

1977 births
Living people
South Korean expatriates in Spain
South Korean film actresses
South Korean television actresses
Spanish television journalists
Spanish film actresses
Spanish television actresses
Women television journalists